Thomas Moffatt Burriss (September 22, 1919 – January 4, 2019) was an American businessman and politician in the state of South Carolina.

Biography
Burriss was born in Anderson, South Carolina and received his bachelor's degree from Clemson University, He served in the South Carolina House of Representatives as a member of the Republican Party from 1977 to 1992, representing Richland County, South Carolina. He was a general contractor, and was a veteran of World War II.

World War II
Burriss served in the United States Army and achieved the rank of captain. He participated in Operation Market Garden and came regularly to the Netherlands for commemorations of World War II. In 2009 he received the Zilveren Stadspenning; an award of the city of Nijmegen. The award was for the 82nd Airborne Division, in which he served. The actions of Burriss and the 82nd Airborne Division in Operation Market Garden was the inspiration for the movie A Bridge Too Far (1977).

References

External links 

 Vet, 99, who tricked 15,000 German troops into surrendering at once, dies
 Veteran speaks to "Airborne" platoon

1919 births
2019 deaths
People from Anderson, South Carolina
Politicians from Columbia, South Carolina
Clemson University alumni
Military personnel from South Carolina
Businesspeople from South Carolina
Republican Party members of the South Carolina House of Representatives
20th-century American businesspeople
20th-century American politicians
United States Army personnel of World War II
United States Army officers